This is a list of members of the Victorian Legislative Assembly as elected at the 15 November 1914 election and subsequent by-elections up to the election of 15 November 1917:

 Hampson resigned in January 1915; replaced by Luke Clough in February 1915.
 Johnstone resigned in June 1917; replaced by James McDonald in July 1917.
 Leckie resigned in March 1917; replaced by Henry Beardmore in April 1917.
 Murray died 4 May 1916, replaced by James Deany in June 1916.
 Plain resigned in March 1917 to contest a Senate seat in the federal election; he was replaced by Robert Purnell in August 1917.
 Sangster died 8 April 1915; replaced by Owen Sinclair in April 1915.

References
 Re-member (a database of all Victorian MPs since 1851). Parliament of Victoria.

Members of the Parliament of Victoria by term
20th-century Australian politicians